Abdelmalek Madani (born 28 February 1983) is an Algerian former professional cyclist.

Major results

2008
 2nd Time trial, National Road Championships
 3rd  Road race, African Road Championships
 5th Grand Prix de la ville de Tunis
2009
 National Road Championships
1st  Time trial
2nd Road race
 Tour de Tipaza
1st Stages 1 & 2
 3rd Overall Perlis Open
 4th Emirates Cup
2010
 1st  Time trial, National Road Championships
 8th Time trial, African Road Championships
2011
 1st Stage 3 Tour du Faso
 Challenge du Prince
3rd Trophée Princier
6th Trophée de l'Anniversaire
 6th Challenge Khouribga, Challenge des phosphates
2012
 2nd Road race, National Road Championships
 Challenge du Prince
2nd Trophée Princier
9th Trophée de l'Anniversaire
2013
 1st  Team time trial, Arab Road Championships (with Azzedine Lagab, Youcef Reguigui and Faysal Hamza)
 2nd Team time trial, African Road Championships
 2nd Road race, National Road Championships
 9th Overall Tour de Blida
2014
 National Road Championships
2nd Time trial
3rd Road race
2015
 2nd Road race, National Road Championships
 2nd Overall Tour de Constantine
1st Stage 1
 7th Overall Tour International de Sétif
2016
 9th Overall Tour d'Annaba

References

External links

1983 births
Living people
Algerian male cyclists
21st-century Algerian people